The Dysfunctional Family Circus was the name of several long-running parodies of the syndicated comic strip The Family Circus, featuring either Bil Keane's artwork with altered captions, or (less often) original artwork made to appear like the targeted strips. First distributed anonymously by mail and fax in 1989, by 1994 various versions of it began to appear on the World Wide Web. The most popular version, edited by Greg Galcik, began in 1995 and ceased in 1999 following a telephone conversation between Galcik and Keane.

DFC booklets 
In 1989, The Dysfunctional Family Circus was created anonymously and began circulating as a series of booklets found in record and book stores, coffee houses, and nightclubs in several U.S. and European cities, notably San Francisco, Chicago, New York, London, and Madrid. They were also distributed by mail to those making requests and posting their mailing address to select Usenet groups.

The booklet series included 15 titles:

 Grandma's Not Dead Yet!
 See, I Told You Cats Could Smell Dead People!
 Ibex, My Ass! That's a Goat!
 Who Wants to See a Hamster Dance?
 Eat Snow Hobo!
 Grandma's Starting to Sprout!
 It All Comes Back, Except One Tablespoon!
 This Guy's Wankin' Off!
 Wait, I Think My Dick's Stuck!
 Boy, This Dog is Fucked Up!
 Oh Yeah? Well, Kiss This!
 Her, Us, Motel, Tonight!
 Crotch Shot!
 Mommy! PJ's Tryin' to Get Out!
 Holy Shit! It's a Priesty Boy!

Each booklet measured  and was attributed to an anonymous publisher whose name was a unique anagram of "Bil Keane". A French translation of volume No. 4, entitled "Qui Veut Voir Un Hamster Dansant?" ("Who Wants To See A Dancing Hamster?"), was distributed by mail, as was an unnumbered volume entitled "Guess Where I Can Fit This!". Before being retired, the booklets spawned two annual calendars, a T-shirt, and a set of drink coasters.

Publication 
The first two issues (issues 1 and 2) were 16 pages each.  Issue 3 expanded to 40 pages. The remaining issues in the main series were 32 pages apiece. The initial press run for each issue was 250 copies. Issues 5 and 8 had secondary runs of 100 copies each.

Several cartoons from the booklets were reprinted in the Anderson Valley Advertiser in Boonville, California, and Browbeat magazine. Others were reproduced in fanzines and as inserts for CDs by the National Hardwood Floor Association and others. Only one cartoon (No. 5, page 14) used the original cartoon caption ("The party's not over yet — I just came home to get my siren and handcuffs").

SpinnWebe

Forerunners 

Often called "DFC", the Dysfunctional Family Circus was first brought to the World-Wide Web by Mark Jason Dominus around March 1994.  
This version featured one (later expanded to four) original Keane cartoon without captions, and ran submission software to allow viewers to suggest their own captions.  Captions were mostly unfiltered.  It was discontinued after about a year, and the concept was adopted by Greg Galcik.

Galcik's version 

Galcik's version became the best known (or perhaps most notorious) and ran on SpinnWebe from June 1995 to 1999 with a run of exactly 500 comics. It attracted between 50,000 and 70,000 page views per day. Galcik and other editors would select the captions they considered to be the funniest and most original, which would then be saved in an online archive. The humor of these captions ranged from what many would consider the disgusting to the surreal, and from the lowbrow to the cerebral. Bil Keane was aware of the site's existence from early on and initially had no objection to it, stating that the jokes were sometimes better than his own. He later sent a cease-and-desist letter which caused the site to be taken down.

Several running jokes developed over the 500 strip run of the series. Recurring themes included incest and child abuse jokes, and aspects of the art itself, such as the featureless void (as Keane's comics frequently lacked a background), and Jeffy's Hypno-Hair (his wavy hair with which he hypnotized others in the family). The parents’ infidelity towards each other was often a source of humor, with Thel claiming to not know who any of the children's real fathers are and Bil's unseen homosexual lover "Uncle" Roy. Another running joke involved breaking the fourth wall and commenting on what Bil drew in the strip that day, such as when Thel was vacuuming with many toys strewn about, one such caption was "That dickhead Bil would draw all this shit in here the one day I vacuum!", and the children were aware that they were stuck within the "circle" that outlined the strip, such as when the scene was full of Christmas presents, a submitted caption was "I tell, ya we could hawk more stuff if you just made the circle bigger!"

End of Galcik's DFC 
In September 1999, Galcik received a warning letter from King Features Syndicate (publishers of The Family Circus), citing copyright violations on the site. Despite the support of the site's fans, Galcik complied after a phone conversation with Keane. In his closing statement, Galcik said while he believed that Dysfunctional Family Circus could be defended as a work of interactive parody, he had developed a grudging respect for the long and continual effort by Bil Keane. Galcik noted that Keane was both polite and gracious in his request for the strip to end, pointing out that the characters being parodied were based on Keane's own family. Keane also agreed to allow Galcik to continue the strip for an additional week in order to reach strip No. 500. The captions for the 500th and final strip were completed in November 1999. Despite King Features' wishes, archives of the series have repeatedly appeared in various sites around the web.

SpinnWebe continued to run "It's A Dysfunctional Life" (later renamed "A1-AAA AmeriCaptions"), which was similar to the Dysfunctional Family Circus, but used viewer-submitted photographs instead of Family Circus cartoons.

Themes 

 Alcoholism
 Animal cruelty
 Cannibalism
 Drug abuse
 Existentialism
 Feminization
 Film homage
 Hallucinations
 Homophobia
 Incest
 Metafiction
 Murder
 Oral sex
 Promiscuity
 Racism
 Sacrilege
 Scatology
 Sexual abuse

References

External links 
 The Free-Floating Dysfunctional Family Circus Archive v1.1.2 - a rehosted archive of SpinnWebe's Dysfunctional Family Circus pictures and captions
 Horselover Fat's Inside Guide to the DFC - An explanation of Spinn's site.
 Family Circus Parody Folds Tent
 Archives of the IADL (It's A Dysfunctional Life) , the successor to the Spinnwebe version of the Dysfunctional Family Circus

American comedy websites
Internet memes
1994 webcomic debuts